Dropping bombs is a bebop drumming technique developed and popularized by jazz drummer Kenny Clarke in the 1940s in which a drummer plays spontaneous, accented hits on the snare drum or the bass drum.

References

Percussion performance techniques